Alberione is an Italian surname. Notable people with the surname include:

 Agustín Alberione (born 1996), Argentine professional footballer
 James Alberione (1884 – 1971), Italian Catholic priest, founder of religious institutes and the Pauline Family

See also 

 Alberoni

Italian-language surnames